Wayne Budd (born November 18, 1941 in Springfield, Massachusetts) is senior counsel at Goodwin Procter, in the firm's Litigation Department, where he specializes in advising clients on business and commercial litigation matters.  Past senior executive vice president and general counsel, U.S., of John Hancock Financial Services, Inc., a division of Manulife Financial. He was responsible for directing all of the company's legal activities as well as overseeing the compliance, human resources, governmental affairs and community relations functions for the Company.

Before joining Hancock, Budd was President-New England at Bell Atlantic Corporation (now Verizon Communications), where, among other duties, he was responsible for regulatory and legislative functions for the New England Region. Before his tenure at Bell Atlantic, he had been a senior partner at Goodwin Procter, a Boston law firm.

From 1969 to 1989, he served with the law firm of Budd, Wiley, & Richlin.

From 1989 to 1992, he had been U.S. Attorney for the District of Massachusetts, serving as the Bay State's chief federal prosecutor and representing the federal government in matters involving civil litigation.

President George H. W. Bush appointed Budd to serve as Associate Attorney General of the United States, in 1992. He oversaw the Civil Rights, Environmental, Tax, Civil and Antitrust divisions at the Department of Justice, as well as the Federal Bureau of Prisons.

Budd also served on the U.S. Sentencing Commission, appointed in 1994 by President Bill Clinton.

He is a past president of the Massachusetts Bar Association and the Massachusetts Black Lawyers Association.

Budd is a graduate of Boston College and received his J.D. degree from Wayne State University Law School. His daughter is Kimberly S. Budd, Chief Justice of the Supreme Judicial Court of Massachusetts.

References 

United States President (1989-1993 : Bush), United States Office of the Federal Register, George H. W. Bush, George Bush: 1989. Washington D.C.: Superintendent of Document, 1993.

1941 births
Living people
United States Associate Attorneys General
United States Attorneys for the District of Massachusetts
Boston College alumni
Wayne State University Law School alumni
Massachusetts lawyers
People from Saugus, Massachusetts
People from Springfield, Massachusetts
Members of the United States Sentencing Commission